Privathospitalet Danmark is Denmark's largest private hospital, established in 1991. It is situated in Charlottenlund just outside Copenhagen.

Among other services, they perform cosmetic surgery.

References

Hospital buildings completed in 1991
Hospitals established in 1991
Hospitals in Denmark
1991 establishments in Denmark